From Dusk till Dawn is a film written by Quentin Tarantino and directed by Robert Rodriguez.

From Dusk till Dawn may also refer to:
 From Dusk till Dawn (franchise), a media franchise
 From Dusk Till Dawn (soundtrack)
 From Dusk Till Dawn (video game)
 From Dusk 'til Dawn (book), a 2007 book by Keith Mann
 From Dusk till Dawn: The Series
 From Dusk 'til Dawn, a 2009 album by Sass Jordan
 "From Dusk Till Dawn", a song by Babymetal on the 2016 album Metal Resistance

See also
 Dusk Till Dawn (disambiguation)